The American College (Brisbane) is a private institution located in Woolloongabba, Brisbane, Australia.

History 
American College (Brisbane) was initially inaugurated in 2009 by Dr. Bruce Flegg and Mark Ryan. Current Campus was inaugurated in 2012 by Oscar Fernandes , James Marape Papua New Guinea and Mark Stewart.

Campus 
American College (Brisbane) has a campus in Brisbane with ultra short throw projectors, computer library with state of the art training rooms for presentation, audio-visual and video conferencing along with student lounges.

References

External links 
 Official site

Australian vocational education and training providers